The SouthCore Financial Centre is a  building located in 120 Bremner Blvd, Downtown Toronto, Canada.  The building is central to the redevelopment of the area in a new neighborhood known simply as South Core.

In October 2013, Delta Hotels announced a new flagship hotel central to South Core.

See also
 South Core, Toronto
 PATH (Toronto)

References

Harbourfront, Toronto
Railway Lands
PATH (Toronto)
Buildings and structures in Toronto
Skyscrapers in Toronto